General Council elections were held in French Ivory Coast (which included Upper Volta at the time) in December 1946 and 5 January 1947. The Democratic Party of Ivory Coast – African Democratic Rally won all 15 seats in the Second College in Ivory Coast, and 24 of the 30 Second College seats overall.

Results

Aftermath
When Upper Volta was reconstituted as a separate territory in 1948, its members left the General Council (10 from the First College, 15 from the Second). By-elections were held in May 1948 for eight First College seats and 12 Second College seats; the PDCI won all of the Second College seats.

References

1946 elections in Africa
1946 in French Upper Volta
1946 in Ivory Coast
1947 elections in Africa
1947 in French Upper Volta
1947 in Ivory Coast
1946
1946
1946
December 1946 events in Africa
January 1947 events in Africa